Events from the year 1972 in art.

Events
March–November – City Sculpture Project in England.
May 21 – In St. Peter's Basilica (Vatican City), Laszlo Toth attacks Michelangelo's Pietà statue with a geologist's hammer, shouting that he is Jesus Christ.
June 8 – KUNSTEN Museum of Modern Art Aalborg, Denmark, designed by Alvar and Elissa Aalto and Jean-Jacques Baruël, is completed.
September 4 – 1972 Montreal Museum of Fine Arts robbery.
September 15 – Release in France of Luis Buñuel's surrealist film The Discreet Charm of the Bourgeoisie.
September 16 – Opening of A.I.R. Gallery at 97 Wooster Street, SoHo, New York, the first artist-run, not-for-profit gallery for women artists in the United States.
 September – Release in the United Kingdom of Ken Russell's biographical film about Gaudier-Brzeska, Savage Messiah.
October 4 – Kimbell Art Museum in Fort Worth, Texas, designed by Louis Kahn, is opened.
date unknown
BBC Television broadcasts Ways of Seeing, a four-part series by John Berger on art.
The Bridgeman Art Library is established as a commercial virtual archive of images by Harriet Bridgeman in London.
Costantino Nivola becomes the first non-American member of the American Academy of Arts and Letters.
Friedensreich Hundertwasser publishes his architectural manifesto, Your window right – your tree duty.
Portmeirion Pottery brings out its best-selling "Botanic Garden" design.
Oliver Millar becomes the first full-time Surveyor of the Queen's Pictures in the United Kingdom, succeeding Anthony Blunt.

Awards
 Archibald Prize: Clifton Pugh – The Hon E G Whitlam
 John Moores Painting Prize - Euan Uglow

Works

 Francis Bacon – Triptych–August 1972
 Thomas Hart Benton – Joplin at the Turn of the Century
 Christo and Jeanne Claude – Valley Curtain (along Colorado State Highway 325)
 Bronisław Chromy – Wawel Dragon (statue, Kraków)
 Marcelle Ferron – Untitled stained glass panel at Montreal Museum of Fine Arts
 Helen Frankenthaler – Coral Wedge
 Barbara Hepworth – Minoan Head and Assembly of Sea Forms
 David Hockney – Portrait of an Artist (Pool with Two Figures)
 Elek Imredy – Girl in a Wetsuit (bronze, Vancouver, British Columbia)
 Joan Jonas – Vertical Roll
 Alexander Liberman – Contact II (sculpture, Portland, Oregon)
 Natalia LL – Consumer Art (video series, begins)
 Paul McCarthy – Black and White Tapes
 Clifton Pugh – Death of a Wombat
 John Raimondi – David
 Liberty Bell (Portland, Oregon)
 Mansu Hill Grand Monument (Pyongyang, North Korea)

Births
January 29 – Brian Wood, American author and illustrator.
April 6 – Rinko Kawauchi, Japanese photographer.
April 29 – Roman Dirge, American comic book artist and magician.
July 2 – Coster Balakasi, Zimbabwean sculptor.
July 19 – Zanele Muholi, South African visual activist.

Full date unknown
 Andrea Büttner, German-born artists.
 Duncan Campbell, Irish-born video artist.
 Jules de Balincourt, French painter.
 Gilles Tréhin, French artist and author.
 Hema Upadhyay, née Hirani, Indian installation artist and photographer (d. 2015).

Deaths

January to June
January 19 – Suzanne Malherbe, French illustrator and designer (b. 1892).
February 19 – Tedd Pierce, American animated cartoon writer, animator and artist (b. 1906).
March 13 – Tony Ray-Jones, English photographer (b. 1941).
March 23 – Cristóbal Balenciaga, Spanish fashion designer (b. 1895).
March 27
M. C. Escher, Dutch graphic artist (b. 1898).
Ricco Wassmer, Swiss painter (b. 1915).
April 26 - Fernando Amorsolo, Filipino painter (b. 1892)

July to December
July 31 – Dod Procter, English painter (b. 1890)
October 23 – Clarice Cliff, English ceramic artist (b. 1899)
October 31 – Beta Vukanović, Serbian painter (b. 1872).
December 23 – Norman Clyde, American mountaineer, nature photographer and naturalist (b. 1885).
December 24 – Gisela Richter, English archaeologist and art historian (b. 1882).
December 29 – Joseph Cornell, American artist and sculptor (b. 1903).

Full date unknown
Gerard Curtis Delano, American painter (b. 1890).
Ilija Bašičević, Serbian painter (b. 1895)

References

See also
 1972 in Fine Arts of the Soviet Union

 
Years of the 20th century in art
1970s in art